Gizo/Ranongga/Simbo/Kolombangara was a single-member constituency of the Governing Council and Legislative Assembly. Located in Western Province, it covered the islands of Gizo, Kolombangara, Ranongga and Simbo. It was established in 1973 when the Governing Council was expanded from 17 to 24 seats, and was abolished in 1976 when the Legislative Assembly (which the Governing Council had been transformed into in 1974) was enlarged to 38 seats, at which point it was split into Gizo/Kolombangara and Ranongga/Simbo. The constituency's sole MP, George Ngumi, contested the Gizo/Kolombangara seat in the 1976 elections, but was defeated by Lawry Eddie Wickham.

List of MPs

Election results

1973

References

Governing Council of the Solomon Islands constituencies
Legislative Assembly of the Solomon Islands constituencies
Gizo, Solomon Islands
Western Province (Solomon Islands)
1973 establishments in the Solomon Islands
Constituencies established in 1973
1976 disestablishments in the Solomon Islands
Constituencies disestablished in 1973